Orland or Ørland is the name, or part of the name, of a number of places and people:

Places

Canada
Orland, Saskatchewan

Norway
Ørland, a municipality

United States
Orland, California
Orland, Georgia
Orland, Indiana
Orland, Maine
Orland, Ohio
Orland, South Dakota
Orland Hills, Illinois
Orland Park, Illinois

People

 Yehu Orland (born 1981), Israeli basketball player and coach